Nenad (Cyrillic script: Ненад) is a male personal name of Slavic origin common in countries that speak Slavic languages. It is more widespread in Bosnia and Herzegovina, Slovenia, Croatia, Serbia, and North Macedonia than in other countries. The name is derived from the word nenadan, which means "unexpected". It was introduced to North Macedonia via Serbian and is now a fairly popular name.

This name is often given to the younger of twins, in this case usually paired with the name Predrag, from the epic Serbian folk song "Predrag i Nenad".

People
Nenad Adamović, Serbian football player
Nenad Bach, Croatian-American composer
Nenad Begović, Serbian football player
Nenad Bjeković, former director of FK Partizan
Nenad Bjeković (footballer born 1974), Serbian football player
Nenad Bjelica, Croatian football player and coach
Nenad Bogdanović, former mayor of Belgrade
Nenad Brnović, Montenegrin football player
Nenad Buljan, Croatian Olympic swimmer
Nenad Čanak, Serbian politician
Nenad Dizdarević, Bosnian film director, screenwriter and producer
Nenad Đorđević, Serbian football player
Nenad Džodić, Serbian football player
Nenad Erić, Serbian football player
Nenad Filipović (footballer), Serbian football player
Nenad Firšt, Slovene composer, conductor and violinist
Nenad Gagro, Bosnian football player
Nenad Gajić, Serbian-Canadian lacrosse player
Nenad Gračan, Croatian football player
Nenad Grozdić, Serbian football player
Nenad Injac, Serbian football player
Nenad Janković, Bosnian Serb musician, composer, actor and television director
Nenad Jestrović, Serbian football player
Nenad Knežević Knez, Montenegrin singer
Nenad Kovačević, Serbian football player
Nenad Krstić, Serbian basketball player
Nenad Krstičić, Serbian football player
Nenad Lazarevski, Serbian football player
Nenad Marinković, Serbian football player
Nenad Marković, Bosnian football player
Nenad Maslovar, Montenegrin football player
Nenad Medić, Serbian-Canadian poker player
Nenad Mijatović, Montenegrin basketball player
Nenad Milijaš, Serbian football player
Nenad Milosavljević, Serbian singer and songwriter
Nenad Mirosavljević, Serbian football player
Nenad Mišanović, Serbian basketball player
Nenad Mišković, Bosnian Serb football player
Nenad Mladenović, Serbian football player
Nenad Nastić, Serbian football player
Nenad Nikolić, several people
Nenad Novaković, Serbian football player
Nenad Pagonis, Serbian kickboxer
Nenad Petrović (writer), Serbian writer
Nenad Petrović (chess problemist), Croatian chess player
Nenad Popović, Bosnian Serb businessman
Nenad Pralija, Croatian football player
Nenad Prokić, Serbian playwright, theatre director and MP in the Parliament of Serbia
Nenad Sakić, Serbian football player and coach
Nenad Savić, Serbian football player
Nenad Slivić, Serbian football player
Nenad Šoštarić, Croatian handball player and coach
Nenad Starovlah, Bosnian football player
Nenad Stekić, Serbian long jumper
Nenad Stojaković, Serbian football player
Nenad Stojanović, Serbian football player
Nenad Stojković, Serbian football player
Nenad Sudarov, Serbian Olympic and Half Ironman distance triathlete
Nenad Todorović, Serbian football player
Nenad Tomović, Serbian football player
Nenad Vanić, Serbian football player
Nenad Vasić, Serbian football player
Nenad Veličković, Bosnian playwright
Nenad Vučinić, Serbian basketball coach
Nenad Vukanić, Montenegrin water polo player
Nenad Vukasović, Serbian politician and lawyer
Nenad Zimonjić, Serbian tennis player

See also
Nenadović

References

Slavic masculine given names
Bosnian masculine given names
Bulgarian masculine given names
Croatian masculine given names
Macedonian masculine given names
Montenegrin masculine given names

Slovene masculine given names
Serbian masculine given names
Ukrainian masculine given names